Space Opera Ground and Air Equipment is a set of miniatures published by T-Rex.

Contents
Space Opera Ground and Air Equipment is a set of detailed little future tanks based on the Space Opera designs.

Reception
Steve Jackson reviewed Space Opera Ground and Air Equipment in The Space Gamer No. 44. Jackson commented that "Altogether a remarkable first offering [...] Recommended, at least in small quantities, to any future armor buff."

References

See also
List of lines of miniatures

Miniature figures
Space Opera (role-playing game)